Yanarrajo (possibly from Quechua yana black, rahu snow, ice, mountain with snow, "black snow peak" is a mountain in the Cordillera Blanca in the Andes of Peru, about  high. It is situated in the Ancash Region, Yungay Province, in the districts Yanama and Yungay. Yanarrajo lies in the Huascarán National Park, south-west of Yanapaccha, near the Llanganuco Lakes.

References

  

Mountains of Peru
Mountains of Ancash Region
Huascarán National Park